Abarema ganymedea is a species of plant in the family Fabaceae. It is known from only two locations: North Antioquia in Colombia, and Esmeraldas in Ecuador.

References

ganymedea
Flora of Colombia
Flora of Ecuador
Vulnerable flora of South America
Taxonomy articles created by Polbot